A list of chemical analysis methods with acronyms.

A
 Atomic absorption spectroscopy (AAS)
 Atomic emission spectroscopy (AES)
 Atomic fluorescence spectroscopy (AFS)
 Alpha particle X-ray spectrometer (APXS)

C
 Capillary electrophoresis (CE)
 Chromatography
 Colorimetry
 Computed tomography
 Cyclic Voltammetry (CV)

D
 Differential scanning calorimetry (DSC)

E
 Electrodialysis
 Electrolysis
 Electron microscopy
 Electron paramagnetic resonance (EPR) also called Electron spin resonance (ESR)
 Electrophoresis
 Energy Dispersive Spectroscopy (EDS/EDX)

F
 Field flow fractionation (FFF)
 Flow injection analysis (FIA)
 Fourier transform infrared spectroscopy (FTIR)

G
 Gas chromatography (GC)
 Gas chromatography-mass spectrometry (GC-MS)
 Gas chromatography-IR spectroscopy (GC-IR)
 Gel permeation chromatography-IR spectroscopy (GPC-IR)

H
 High performance liquid chromatography (HPLC)
 High performance liquid chromatography-IR spectroscopy (HPLC-IR)

I
 Ion Microprobe (IM)
 Inductively coupled plasma (ICP)
 Ion-mobility spectrometry (IMS)
 Ion selective electrode (ISE) e.g. determination of pH

L
 Laser induced breakdown spectroscopy (LIBS)
 Liquid chromatography-IR spectroscopy (LC-IR)
 Liquid chromatography-mass spectrometry (LC-MS)

M
 Mass spectrometry (MS)
 Mössbauer spectroscopy

N
 Neutron activation analysis
 Nuclear magnetic resonance (NMR)

O
Optical microscopy
Optical emission spectroscopy
Optical rotation (OR)

P
 Particle induced X-ray emission spectroscopy (PIXE)
 Pyrolysis gas chromatography mass spectrometry (PY-GC-MS)
 Particle size determination by laser diffraction (PSD)

R
 Raman spectroscopy
 Refractive index
 Resonance enhanced multiphoton ionization (REMPI)

S
Secondary ion mass spectrometry
Supercritical fluid chromatography (SFC)

T
 Transmission electron microscopy (TEM)
 Titration
 Thermogravimetric Analysis (TGA)

V
 Vacuum fusion

X
 X-ray photoelectron spectroscopy (XPS)
X-ray diffraction (XRD)
 X-ray fluorescence spectroscopy (XRF)
 X-ray microscopy (XRM)

See also
Analytical chemistry
List of materials analysis methods

 Analytical chemistry
Analysis methods